Sitana thondalu, the Nagarjuna Sagar fan-throated lizard, is a species of agamid lizard. It is endemic to India.

References

Sitana
Reptiles of India
Reptiles described in 2018
Taxa named by Veerappan Deepak